The UK Singles Chart was first compiled in 1969. However the records and statistics listed here date back to 1952 because the Official Charts Company counts a selected period of the New Musical Express chart (only from 1952 to 1960) and the Record Retailer chart from 1960 to 1969 as predecessors for the period prior to 11 February 1969, where multiples of competing charts coexisted side by side. For example, the BBC compiled its own chart based on an average of the music papers of the time; many songs announced as having reached number one on BBC Radio and Top of the Pops prior to 1969 may not be listed here as chart-toppers since they do not meet the legacy criteria of the Charts Company.

Number one hits

Most number ones

The following is a list of all the acts who are on eight or more UK number one songs with an individual credit (meaning, the main artist or named separately as a featured artist – being part of a group does not count towards an individual's total).

Simply playing or singing on a single without credit will not count, or the top positions would almost certainly belong to session musicians such as Clem Cattini who is reported to have played drums on over 40 number ones.

Most weeks at number one by artist

Most weeks at number one by single
The record for most non-consecutive weeks at number one is 18 by Frankie Laine's "I Believe" in 1953. It spent nine weeks at number one, dropped down for a week, returned to number one for six weeks, dropped down for a further week and returned to number one for a third time for three weeks.

The longest unbroken run at number one is "(Everything I Do) I Do It for You" by Bryan Adams, which spent 16 consecutive weeks in 1991.

Ed Sheeran is the only artist to ever have multiple songs spend 10 or more weeks at the top of the charts, achieving the feat with both "Shape of You" in 2017 and "Bad Habits" in 2021.

Below is a table of all singles that have spent 10 or more weeks at the top of the charts:

Note: Songs denoted with an asterisk (*) spent non-consecutive weeks at number one.

Self-replacement at number one
Since the inception of the UK Singles Chart in 1952 only seven acts have replaced themselves at the top of the UK charts with exactly the same billing (as opposed to any named artist, for example 'Cliff Richard and the Shadows' and 'The Shadows' have had back to back number ones on four occasions):

 The Beatles — "I Want to Hold Your Hand" replaced "She Loves You" (14 December 1963)
 John Lennon — "Woman" replaced "Imagine" (7 February 1981)
 Elvis Presley — "One Night/I Got Stung" replaced "Jailhouse Rock" (22 January 2005)
 Justin Bieber — "Love Yourself" replaced "Sorry" (10 December 2015)
 Justin Bieber — "Despacito" replaced "I'm the One" (18 May 2017)
 Ed Sheeran — "River" replaced "Perfect" (25 January 2018)
 Ariana Grande — "Break Up with Your Girlfriend, I'm Bored" replaced "7 Rings" (21 February 2019); "7 Rings" replaced "Break Up with Your Girlfriend, I'm Bored" (28 February 2019)
 Ed Sheeran — "Shivers" replaced "Bad Habits" (23 September 2021)
 Ed Sheeran — "Sausage Rolls for Everyone" replaced "Merry Christmas" (30 December 2021); "Merry Christmas" replaced "Sausage Rolls for Everyone" (6 January 2022)
 Elton John — "Sausage Rolls for Everyone" replaced "Merry Christmas" (30 December 2021); "Merry Christmas" replaced "Sausage Rolls for Everyone" (6 January 2022).

In addition, Ariana Grande is the first female artist to replace herself, and the first artist to replace herself at Number 1 for two consecutive weeks.

Most consecutive number ones 

The Beatles had 11 consecutive number ones with official releases on Parlophone between 1963 ("From Me To You") and 1966 ("Yellow Submarine" / "Eleanor Rigby"), though releases of archive material from their previous record company also charted during this time.

Most consecutive number ones from chart debut
Spice Girls became the first British music act and girl group to have their first six singles reach number one on the UK singles chart between 1996 and 1997 with "Wannabe" in July, 1996 to "Too Much" in December, 1997.

Westlife became the first music act to have their first seven singles ("Swear It Again", "If I Let You Go", "Flying Without Wings", "I Have a Dream / "Seasons in the Sun", "Fool Again", "Against All Odds" & "My Love") to reach number one from 1999 to 2000. It took Westlife just over 18 months to achieve their first seven number ones, faster than any other music act.

Most songs to debut at Number 1 on the chart

Acts with the most songs to debut at Number 1 on the Official singles chart. Westlife claim the most Number 1 debuts on the Official Singles Chart, with all 14 of their chart-toppers landing there in their first week.

Lowest selling number one
The lowest weekly sale for a number one single is 17,694 copies held by Orson's "No Tomorrow" in 2006.

The addition of downloads to the UK charts meant that singles could reach number one with no physical copy being released. The first single to achieve this was Gnarls Barkley's "Crazy" in early 2006. Since 2014, audio streaming has been included in the calculation of chart position, so it is now possible for a single to reach number one without selling any copies (if it were only available on streaming services). In the week ending 24 September 2015, "What Do You Mean?" by Justin Bieber became the first number one with over half of its chart sales made up of streaming points, with sales of 30,000 and 36,000 points from 3.6 million streams.

Since the incorporation of streaming into the singles chart, the Official Charts Company have continued to compile a sales only chart. In week ending 27 April 2017 "Sign of the Times" by Harry Styles became the first number one in the sales-only chart to sell less than "No Tomorrow" by Orson, with 16,686 copies.

Longest/Shortest song to reach number one
In terms of a song's running length, "All Around the World" by Oasis (1998) at 9 minutes and 38 seconds is the longest song to reach No.1. "What Do You Want?" by Adam Faith at 1 minute 35 seconds (1959) is the shortest.

Non-English language number-ones
 "Je t'aime... moi non-plus" – Serge Gainsbourg and Jane Birkin (French – 11 October 1969 for one week)
 "Chanson D'Amour" – The Manhattan Transfer (French/English – 12 March 1977 for three weeks)
 "Begin the Beguine" – Julio Iglesias (Spanish/English – 5 December 1981 for one week)
 "Rock Me Amadeus" – Falco (German/English – 10 May 1986 for one week)
 "La Bamba" – Los Lobos (Spanish – 1 August 1987 for two weeks)
 "Sadeness (Part I)" – Enigma (French/Latin/English – 19 January 1991 for one week)
 "The Ketchup Song (Aserejé)" – Las Ketchup (Spanish/English – 19 October 2002 for one week)
 "We No Speak Americano" – Yolanda Be Cool and DCUP (Neapolitan/English – 31 July 2010 for one week)
 "Loca People" - Sak Noel (Spanish/English - 2 October 2011 for one week)
 "Gangnam Style" – Psy (Korean/English – 6 October 2012 for one week)
 "Despacito" – Luis Fonsi and Daddy Yankee featuring Justin Bieber (Spanish/English – 18 May 2017 for eleven non-consecutive weeks)
Source:

Acts to occupy the top two
The Beatles
"I Want to Hold Your Hand" and "She Loves You" (three weeks in December 1963)
"Hello Goodbye" and "Magical Mystery Tour" (three weeks in December 1967)
John Travolta — "Summer Nights" (with Olivia Newton-John) and "Sandy" (one week in November 1978)
John Lennon — "Imagine" and: "Happy Xmas (War Is Over)"; "Woman" (both January 1981)
Frankie Goes to Hollywood — "Two Tribes" and "Relax" (two weeks in July 1984)
Madonna — "Into the Groove" and "Holiday" (one week in August 1985)
Justin Bieber
"Sorry" and "Love Yourself" (one week in November 2015); "Love Yourself" and "Sorry" (five non-consecutive weeks in December 2015 and January 2016)
"Cold Water" (with MØ & Major Lazer) and "Let Me Love You" (three weeks in August 2016)
"Despacito" (with Luis Fonsi & Daddy Yankee) and "I'm the One" (with DJ Khaled, Lil Wayne, Quavo & Chance the Rapper) (four weeks in May and June 2017)
Ed Sheeran
"Shape of You" and "Castle on the Hill" (five weeks in January and February 2017); "How Would You Feel (Paean)" (one week in February 2017); "Galway Girl" (five weeks in March and April 2017)
"Perfect" and "River" (with Eminem) (three non-consecutive weeks in December 2017 and January 2018)
"Sausage Rolls for Everyone" (with LadBaby and Elton John) and "Merry Christmas" (with Elton John) (one week in December 2021)
Ariana Grande — "Break Up with Your Girlfriend, I'm Bored" and "7 Rings" (one week in February 2019); "7 Rings" and "Break Up with Your Girlfriend, I'm Bored" (one week in February 2019)
Adele — "Easy on Me" and "Oh My God" (one week in December 2021)
Elton John — "Sausage Rolls for Everyone" (with LadBaby and Ed Sheeran) and "Merry Christmas" (with Ed Sheeran) (one week in December 2021)
Harry Styles — "As It Was" and "Late Night Talking" (one week in June 2022)
In addition, in the final week that Justin Bieber was at No. 1 and No. 2 with "Love Yourself" and "Sorry", "What Do You Mean" was at No. 3. For the first three weeks that Ed Sheeran was at No. 1 and No. 2 with "Shape of You" and "Galway Girl", "Castle on the Hill" was at No. 3, and for the first of these three weeks Sheeran's "Perfect", "New Man" and "Happier" were at No. 4, No. 5 and No. 6 respectively.

Most weeks

Weeks on chart by single
Most weeks in the chart by a single: 
Top 100: "Mr Brightside" by The Killers (345 weeks)
Top 75: "Perfect" by Ed Sheeran (130 weeks)
Top 40: "All I Want for Christmas Is You" by Mariah Carey (86 weeks)
Top 10: "All I Want for Christmas Is You" by Mariah Carey (39 weeks)

Longest consecutive run in the chart by a single*
Top 100: “Blinding Lights” by The Weeknd (105 weeks) 
Top 75: "Blinding Lights" by The Weeknd (103 weeks) 
Top 40: "Thinking Out Loud" by Ed Sheeran (54 weeks)
Top 10: "I Believe" by Frankie Laine (35 weeks)

Sales

Fastest selling singles
The fastest selling single in chart history is "Candle in the Wind 1997" by Elton John which sold 1.55 million copies in its first week (it sold 658,000 on the first day of release, 13 September 1997).

The fastest selling debut single is "Anything Is Possible/Evergreen" by Will Young, which sold 1.11 million copies in its first week on sale. Publicity had built up due to the televised talent contest Pop Idol with 8.7 million people phoning in to vote for the finalists.

The fastest selling single by a girl group is the Spice Girls "2 Become 1" which sold over 462,000 copies during its first week on sale and over 763,000 copies in a fortnight. In total, the single sold over 1.2 million copies to date.

Biggest-selling singles artists

Artists with references have been updated as the original list was published by the Official Charts Company during 2012. This means that positions on this list may not be 100% accurately reflected as most of the artists are still active and releasing new singles. This includes all singles (solo, duets and as featuring artists) and in all formats (vinyl, cassette, CD, digital). All singles with collaborations are counted several times on the list.

 Justin Bieber (32,000,000)
 Madonna (28,345,000)
 Rihanna (27,100,000)
 Michael Jackson (26,995,000)
 Beyoncé (22,870,000)
 Mariah Carey (22,400,000)
 The Beatles (22,100,000)
 Elton John (21,635,000) 
 Cliff Richard (21,500,000)
 Coldplay (19,000,000)
 Westlife (12,854,000)
 Queen (12,800,000)
 Elvis Presley (12,205,000)
 David Bowie (12,000,000)
 ABBA (11,300,000)
 Ariana Grande (10,700,000) 
 Paul McCartney (10,200,000)
 Kylie Minogue (10,100,000)
 The Rolling Stones (10,100,000) 
 Rod Stewart 
 Take That
 Stevie Wonder
 Oasis (9,079,000)
 Eminem 
 Whitney Houston
 Spice Girls (8,500,000)
 George Michael 
 Robbie Williams 
 Bee Gees (7,600,000)
 U2 (7,500,000)
 Shakin' Stevens
 Britney Spears 
 Lady Gaga (7,357,000)
 Status Quo (7,200,000)
 Boyzone (7,100,000)
 Blondie (7,037,000)
 The Black Eyed Peas (7,034,000)
 Boney M (6,859,000)
 Slade (6,856,000)
 Celine Dion 
 UB40 (6,600,000)
 Olivia Newton-John 
 Tom Jones

Outside number one

Acts to peak across the entire top ten

Biggest selling non-number one

The record is held by Maroon 5 with their 2011 single, "Moves Like Jagger", with 1.55 million copies sold. The song peaked at number two for seven weeks. The record was formerly held by Wham! for their 1984 Christmas release, "Last Christmas" / "Everything She Wants", until it finally charted at the top spot in 2021.

The biggest selling single to peak at number three is New Order's "Blue Monday", which has sold over a million copies. However, it garnered its total sales via two further remixes of the track, meaning its one million sales are attributed over all three releases. The biggest selling release to peak at number three is Ed Sheeran's "The A Team", which has sold over 1,067,000 copies since its 2011 release. The biggest selling single never to make the top 5 is "Chasing Cars" by Snow Patrol, which peaked at number 6 and has sold more copies than "The A Team". The biggest selling single not to reach the top 10 is "A Thousand Years" by Christina Perri  with physical sales of 844,000 and a peak of number 11.

Simultaneously charting songs and singles
"Unchained Melody" is the only song to have four versions by different artists charting in the Top 20 at the same time (Al Hibbler, Les Baxter, Jimmy Young and Liberace in June 1955).
"Hallelujah" charted in the same week in December 2008 with three artists (Alexandra Burke at No. 1, Jeff Buckley at No. 2, Leonard Cohen at No. 36). It is also the second time in UK single chart where different versions hold the top two spots (the first being Singing the Blues).
"Santa Claus is Coming to Town" charted for 3 different artists (The Jackson 5 at No. 30, Bruce Springsteen at No. 48 and Michael Buble at No. 82) on 28 December 2018. 
"White Christmas" also charted by three different artists (Bing Crosby at No. 31, Gwen Stefani at No. 62 and Glee Cast featuring Chris Colfer & Darren Criss at No. 98) on 28 December 2018.

Most hits without reaching...
Most Number 2 hits without reaching Number 1: Sash! (5)
Most Top 5 hits without reaching Number 1: Janet Jackson (9)
Most Top 75 hits without reaching Number 1: Glee Cast (100)
Most Top 75 hits without reaching the Top 10: The 1975 (23)
Most Top 40 hits without reaching the Top 10: Super Furry Animals (19)
Most Number 11 hits without reaching the Top 10: Lethal Bizzle (3)
Most Top 75 hits without reaching the Top 40: Gorky's Zygotic Mynci (8)

Most top 10 hits without a number 1 single

Other records

First to...
 On January 8, 2016, Justin Bieber became the first artist in history to hold the top three positions in the UK Official Singles Chart. He achieved this feat as "Love Yourself", "Sorry" and "What Do You Mean?" charted at positions one, two and three simultaneously.
 The first song to have four separate spells at number one with the same artist line-up was "Three Lions" by Baddiel & Skinner and The Lightning Seeds. The original 1996 version had two one-week stints in 1996, while the 1998 re-work had one three-week spell at the top. The 2018 FIFA World Cup propelled it to a record-breaking fourth outing at the top in July 2018.
 The first week when all the Top 10 singles (actually Top 12) stayed at the previous week's positions (other than Xmas or other "frozen" charts) occurred on 7 June 2019. This is only true of the combined sales and streaming chart; in the sales only chart, only the top two positions were static and there was a new entry.
 On July 29, 2021, Little Mix became the first girl group in history to spend 100 weeks inside the UK singles chart Top 10.

Downloads
Downloads grew steadily in popularity after first being integrated into the chart in 2005. In early September 2004, the UK Official Download Chart was launched, and a new live recording of Westlife's "Flying Without Wings" was the first number-one. The first number one to chart without ever receiving a UK physical release was Coldplay's "Viva la Vida" in June 2008. As of 2012, very few songs are given a physical release, and almost the entire chart is released solely on digital download.

On 22 June 2008, both songs in the top two were there on downloads alone:

 "Viva la Vida" by Coldplay
 "Closer" by Ne-Yo

On 31 August 2008, the top three were download-only at the time:

 "I Kissed a Girl" by Katy Perry
 "Pjanoo" by Eric Prydz
 "Disturbia" by Rihanna

On 1 March 2009, the top four were all download-only:

 "My Life Would Suck Without You" by Kelly Clarkson
 "Love Story" by Taylor Swift
 "Poker Face" by Lady Gaga
 "Dead and Gone" by T.I. (feat. Justin Timberlake)

By 13 February 2010, the whole top 9 consisted of download-only songs:

 "Fireflies" by Owl City
 "Under Pressure (Ice Ice Baby)" by Jedward (feat. Vanilla Ice)
 "If We Ever Meet Again" by Timbaland (feat. Katy Perry)
 "Don't Stop Believin'" by Glee Cast
 "Empire State of Mind (Part II) Broken Down" by Alicia Keys
 "Replay" by Iyaz
 "Starstrukk" by 3OH!3 (feat. Katy Perry)
 "One Shot" by JLS
 "Don't Stop Believin'" by Journey

Notes

See also
List of songs which have spent the most weeks on the UK Singles Chart

References

British record charts
UK Singles Chart